Xundian Hui and Yi Autonomous County is an autonomous county in the northeast-central part of Yunnan province, China. It is under the administration of the prefecture-level city of Kunming, the provincial capital.

Geography 
Xundian lies northeast of the center of Yunnan. The Niulan River flows through its territory.

Administrative divisions
Xundian is divided into one subdistrict: Rende 仁德街道; nine towns: Yangjie 羊街镇, Kedu 柯渡镇, Tangdian 倘甸镇, Gongshan 功山镇, Hekou 河口镇, Qixing 七星镇, Xianfeng 先锋镇, Jijie 鸡街镇, Fenghe 凤合镇; and four townships: Liushao 六哨乡, Lianhe 联合乡, Jinyuan 金源乡, and Diansha 甸沙乡.

Ethnic groups
Yi ethnic subgroups in Xundian County are Black Yi 黑彝, White Yi 白彝, and Dry Yi 干彝 (Xundian County Gazetteer 1999:118). Black Yi and White Yi are widespread, while Dry Yi is restricted to Gongshan Town 功山镇 and Hekou Township 河口乡.

Other ethnic groups in Xundian are Miao (Big Flowery Miao 大花苗 subgroup), Hui, and Han (Xundian County Gazetteer 1999).

Climate

Industrial Parks
 Xundian Special Industrial Park

Gallery

References 

 Area Code and Postal Code in Yunnan Province

External links 

 Xundian County Official Website
 Regional Map of Xundian

County-level divisions of Kunming